This is a list of attacks that have occurred on school property or related primarily to school issues or events. A narrow definition of the word attacks is used for this list so as to exclude warfare, public attacks (as in political protests), accidental shootings, and suicides and murder-suicides by rejected spouses or suitors. Incidents that involved only staff who work at the school have been classified as belonging at List of workplace killings. It also excludes events where no injuries take place, if an attack is foiled. Entries without reliable sources will be deleted.

The list is divided into three main chronological sections according to school classification: primary, secondary, and post-secondary. Additionally, a list is provided for foiled school-related attack plots that resulted in a conviction of perpetrator(s).

Primary school and kindergarten incidents
List of attacks related to primary schools

Secondary school incidents 
List of attacks related to secondary schools

College and university school incidents
List of attacks related to post-secondary schools

Foiled or exposed plots
List of unsuccessful attacks related to schools

See also 
 List of school massacres by death toll
 School bullying
 School shooting
 School violence
 List of rampage killers (school massacres)
List of school shootings in the United States (before 2000)
List of school shootings in the United States (2000–present)
 List of school shootings in the United States by death toll

References

Notes